Leonid Tkachenko may refer to:

 Leonid Tkachenko (footballer) (born 1953), former Soviet footballer and football manager
 Leonid Tkachenko (artist) (born 1927), Soviet and Russian painter